Lucas Belvaux (born 14 November 1961) is a Belgian actor and film director. His directing credits include the Trilogie, consisting of three films with interlocking stories and characters, each of which was filmed in a different genre.  The three films are Cavale, a thriller; Un couple épatant, a comedy; and Après la vie, a melodrama. The Trilogie received the André Cavens Award. His film La Raison du plus faible was entered into the 2006 Cannes Film Festival. His film One Night (38 témoins) was nominated for seven Magritte Awards, winning Best Screenplay.

He also appeared as an actor in the film Merry Christmas (2005). He is the brother of Rémy Belvaux and Bruno Belvaux.

Filmography

As director/writer

As actor 
  1981: Allons Z'Enfants 
  1982: The Trout 
  1983: The Death of Mario Ricci 
  1985:  Chicken with Vinegar
  1991:  Madame Bovary
  2004:  Tomorrow We Move

References

External links

1961 births
Living people
Belgian male actors
People from Namur (city)
Magritte Award winners
Belgian film directors
Belgian screenwriters
20th-century Belgian male actors
21st-century Belgian male actors